Zhu Haiwei (born 9 October 1991) is a Chinese footballer who currently plays for Hebei Kungfu in the China League One.

Club career 
Zhu Haiwei started his professional football career in 2009 when he joined China League Two side Tianjin Songjiang. He was the key player in Tianjin's promotion campaign in the 2010 season. Zhu was signed by Superettan side Jönköpings Södra along with Tan Binliang after a successful trial in April 2013. He returned to China in the summer of 2013 but didn't pass the trial with Chengdu Blades. Zhu transferred to Campeonato de Portugal club Sertanense in September 2013. He made his debut for Sertanense on 13 October 2013, in a 2–1 home win against Nogueirense, coming on as a substitute for Dino Pereira in the 77th minute.

Zhu moved to China League One side Hebei Zhongji in January 2014. On 15 March 2014, he made his debut for Hebei in a 2–2 away draw against Guangdong Sunray Cave. Zhu scored his first goal for Hebei on 17 May 2014 in a 2–1 home win against Yanbian Changbaishan. He scored 2 goals in 26 appearances in the 2014 season which secured Hebei's stay in the second flight for the next season. Zhu kept his position in the 2015 season after China Fortune Land Development injected a large amount of money to the club. He played 28 league matches and scored 3 goals in the season as Hebei China Fortune won promotion to the Chinese Super League by finishing the runners-up in the league. Zhu made his Super League debut on 2 April 2016 in a 1–1 away draw against Jiangsu Suning, coming on as a substitute for Jiang Ning in the 90th minute. Zhu appeared 20 times in the Super League between 2016 and 2017 season, mainly coming on as a substitute.

On 17 January 2018, Zhu transferred to China League One side Zhejiang Greentown along with teammate Xu Xiaolong.

Career statistics 
.

References

External links
 

Living people
1991 births
Association football midfielders
Chinese footballers
Footballers from Guangzhou
Tianjin Tianhai F.C. players
Jönköpings Södra IF players
Sertanense F.C. players
Hebei F.C. players
Zhejiang Professional F.C. players
Chinese Super League players
China League One players
Chinese expatriate footballers
Expatriate footballers in Sweden
Expatriate footballers in Portugal
Chinese expatriate sportspeople in Sweden
Chinese expatriate sportspeople in Portugal